The Donora-Webster Bridge was a truss bridge spanning the Monongahela River between the borough of Donora, Pennsylvania and the village of Webster in Rostraver Township, Westmoreland County, Pennsylvania. Originally built in 1908 to serve rail traffic, the bridge was eventually fully converted in 1938 for automobile use only.. The structure connected Route 837 on the west bank of the river and Route 906 on the east side. The closest open crossings are at Route 1022 (Donora-Monessen Bridge) to the south (upstream), and the Route 136 (Monongahela City Bridge) to the north (downstream), a several-mile detour either way. On July 1, 2015 the bridge was demolished after being closed for several years due to severe structural deficiency.

The bridge's closure was the subject of criticism by locals, as it was blamed for worsening Donora's already poor economic situation. Pennsylvania state representative Peter Daley pushed for a restoration or replacement of the original bridge, but to no avail, sealing the fate of the area. 

It was designated as a historic bridge by the Washington County History & Landmarks Foundation.

See also
List of crossings of the Monongahela River

References

External links
[ National Register nomination form]

Bridges over the Monongahela River
Bridges in Washington County, Pennsylvania
Bridges completed in 1908
Buildings and structures demolished in 2015
Road bridges on the National Register of Historic Places in Pennsylvania
Railroad bridges on the National Register of Historic Places in Pennsylvania 
Truss bridges in the United States
National Register of Historic Places in Washington County, Pennsylvania
1908 establishments in Pennsylvania
2009 disestablishments in Pennsylvania